Traci Park (born 1976) is an American attorney and politician, who is the Los Angeles City Councilmember for the 11th district since 2022. Having entered the race to challenge incumbent Mike Bonin, Park became a frontrunner for the open seat upon Bonin's announcement of retirement, and defeated civil rights attorney Erin Darling in the general election.

Early life and career 
Park graduated from Johns Hopkins University in 1997 with a Bachelor's degree in History, later graduating from Loyola Law School in 2001 with a Juris Doctor. In 2009, she started working for Burke, Williams and Sorensen, a law firm specializing in public entities.

Political career

Los Angeles City Council 
In July 2021, Park announced her candidacy for Los Angeles City Council, hoping to unseat incumbent Mike Bonin of the 11th district. After Bonin announced his retirement, the seat became open with Erin Darling becoming the progressive candidate in the race. Both Darling and Park advanced to the general election, with Park narrowly behind Darling in the results. Park was previously a registered Republican before switching to the Democratic Party.

During the campaigns, Darling criticized Park for representing the city of Anaheim against a city employee who accused a supervisor for their use of the N-word, with Park criticizing Darling for representing "unsavory criminal defendants." Park also criticized Darling for his association with Bonin, as well as Bonin's record with homelessness in the district. In the election, Park defeated Darling by a four-point margin.

During her swearing-in ceremony, protesters were removed after trying to interrupt Park's speech. She voted in favor of the 41.18 ordinance, which banned sitting, sleeping and storing property within 500 feet of schools, day-care centers, parks, recreation centers, a contrast to her predecessor's refusal to support the ordinance.

Electoral history

References

External links 
 Traci Park for Los Angeles City Council District 11

Living people
21st-century American women politicians
Lawyers from Los Angeles
Los Angeles City Council members
Johns Hopkins University alumni
Loyola Law School alumni
21st-century American politicians
1976 births